Cassine orientalis, known locally as bois d'olive, is a tall canopy tree endemic to the Mascarene islands of Mauritius, Reunion and Rodrigues.

In its native islands the tree has been severely over-exploited for its valuable reddish wood. Adults reach up to 20 meters in height. The fruits resemble small olives, from which the local name derives.

Juveniles have shiny narrow leaves with a bright red mid-rib and smooth edges; while adult leave are wide and oval with a serrated margin.

References

orientalis
Flora of Mauritius
Plants described in 1782